The Chair may refer to:
 The Chair (Aintree Racecourse), a fence on the British horse racing course
 The Chair (film), 2007
 The Chair (game show), an American TV program
 "The Chair" (song), recorded by George Strait, 1985
 "The Chair", a song by Living Colour from the 2009 album The Chair in the Doorway
 "The Chair", a song by Jars of Clay from the soundtrack to the film The Long Kiss Goodnight
 "The Chair", a 1949 furniture design by Hans J. Wegner 
 The Chair, a 1998 book about chair design by Galen Cranz
 The Chair, a 2014 TV series by Starz
The Chair (2021 TV series), a 2021 American comedic drama TV miniseries

See also

Chair (disambiguation)
 The Chairs, a 1952 play by Eugène Ionesco
 Electric chair